David Hunt (born 17 April 1959) is an English former footballer who played in the Football League as a midfielder for Derby County, Notts County, Aston Villa and Mansfield Town.

References

External links
 

1959 births
Living people
Footballers from Leicester
English footballers
Association football midfielders
Derby County F.C. players
Notts County F.C. players
Aston Villa F.C. players
Mansfield Town F.C. players
Burton Albion F.C. players
English Football League players